Sara Riaz (died: April 2014, Karachi) was a celebrity chef from Pakistan. She was associated with the Pakistani television network ARY Digital. She died of breast cancer.

Career 
Sara had more than 20 years of cooking experience. She was specifically associated with the cooking channel of ARY Digital named ARY Zauq. She was well known nationally as well as internationally. She regularly hosted a morning cooking show 'Khana Pakana' in ARY Zauq fives days a week. She made regular appearances in morning shows to advise on cooking recipes and health and nutrition. Her unique selling point was her easy to follow cooking instructions. She was also the owner of a professional recipes cooking training center in Karachi, Pakistan. Her recipes are hosted numerous websites on the internet.

Death 
She died in April, 2014. She left behind a husband and no children. She was suffering from breast cancer.

References 

Women chefs
Pakistani television chefs
Pakistani women in television
2014 deaths
Year of birth missing
Place of birth missing
Deaths from cancer in Pakistan
Deaths from breast cancer